Ernst Hartwig Kantorowicz (May 3, 1895 – September 9, 1963) was a German historian of medieval political and intellectual history and art, known for his 1927 book Kaiser Friedrich der Zweite on Holy Roman Emperor Frederick II, and The King's Two Bodies (1957) on medieval and early modern ideologies of monarchy and the state. He was an elected member of both the American Philosophical Society and the American Academy of Arts and Sciences.

Career

Early life and education
Kantorowicz was born in Posen (then part of Prussia) to a wealthy, assimilated German-Jewish family, and as a young man was groomed to take over his family's prosperous liquor distillery business. He served as an officer in the German Army for four years in World War I. After the war, he matriculated at the University of Berlin to study economics, at one point also joining a right-wing militia that fought against Polish forces in the Greater Poland Uprising (1918–1919) and helped put down the Spartacist uprising in Berlin. The following year, he transferred briefly to the University of Munich, where once again he was involved in armed clashes between leftists and pro-government militias, but soon thereafter settled on the University of Heidelberg where he continued to enroll in economics courses while developing a broader interest in Arabic, Islamic Studies, history, and geography.

While in Heidelberg, Kantorowicz became involved with the so-called George-Kreis or George circle, a group of artists and intellectuals devoted to the German symbolist poet and aesthete Stefan George, believing that George's poetry and philosophy would become the foundation of a great revival of the nationalist spirit in post-war Germany. In 1921, Kantorowicz was awarded a doctorate supervised by Eberhard Gothein based on a slim dissertation on "artisan associations" in the Muslim world.

Frederick the Second

Although his degree was in Islamic economic history, Kantorowicz's interests soon turned to the European Middle Ages and to ideas about kingship in particular. His association with the elitist and culturally conservative George-Kreis inspired Kantorowicz to undertake writing a sweeping and highly unorthodox biography of the great Holy Roman emperor Frederick II, published in German in 1927 and English in 1931. Instead of offering a more typical survey of laws, institutions, and important political and military achievements of Frederick's reign, the book struck a distinctly panegyrical tone, portraying Frederick as a tragic hero and an idealized "Roman German".

It included no footnotes and seemed to elide historical events with more fanciful legends and propagandistic literary depictions. The work elicited a combination of bewilderment and criticism from the mainstream historical academy. Reviewers complained that it was literary myth-making and not a work of serious historical scholarship. As a result, Kantorowicz published a hefty companion volume (Ergänzungsband) in 1931 which contained detailed historical documentation for the biography.

Frankfurt
Despite the furor over the Frederick book, and not having written a formal Habilitationsschrift (second thesis to qualify for a professorial appointment), Kantorowicz received an (honorary) professorship at the University of Frankfurt in 1930, though he remained in Berlin until 1931. By December 1933, however, Kantorowicz had to cease giving lectures due to increasing pressure on Jewish academics under the new Nazi regime, though he gave a subversive "reinaugural" lecture titled "The Secret Germany"—a motto of the George-Kreis—setting out his position in light of the new political situation on November 14 of that year. After taking several leaves of absence, he was finally granted an early retirement with a pension in 1935. He remained in Germany until departing for the United States in 1938, when after the Kristallnacht riots it became clear that the situation for even assimilated Jews such as himself was no longer tenable.

From Berkeley to Princeton
Kantorowicz accepted a lectureship at the University of California, Berkeley in 1939. After several years, Kantorowicz was finally able to secure a permanent professorship, but in 1950, he famously resigned in protest when the UC Regents demanded that all continuing faculty sign a loyalty oath disavowing affiliation with any politically subversive movements. Kantorowicz insisted he was no leftist and pointed to his role in an anti-communist militia as a young university student, but nonetheless objected on principle to an instrument which he viewed as a blatant infringement on academic freedom and freedom of conscience more generally.

During the controversy in Berkeley, two eminent German émigré medievalists working in Princeton, Theodore Mommsen (grandson of the great classical historian) and the art historian Erwin Panofsky, persuaded J. Robert Oppenheimer, director of the prestigious Institute for Advanced Study, to appoint Kantorowicz to the Institute's faculty of Historical Studies. Kantorowicz accepted the offer in January 1951 and moved to Princeton, where he remained for the rest of his career.

The King's Two Bodies

In 1957, Kantorowicz published his masterpiece, The King's Two Bodies, which explored, in the words of the volume's subtitle, "medieval political theology". The book traced the ways in which theologians, historians, and canon lawyers in the Middle Ages and early modern period understood "the king" as both a mortal individual and an institution which transcends time. Drawing on a diverse array of textual and visual sources, including Shakespeare and Dante, The King's Two Bodies made a major contribution to the way historians and political scientists came to understand the evolution of ideas about authority and charisma vested in a single individual versus transpersonal conceptions of the realm or the state in pre-modern Europe. The book remains a classic in the field.

Death
Kantorowicz died in his home in Princeton of an aortic aneurysm at age 68.

Reception

Cantor controversy
Kantorowicz was the subject of a controversial biographical sketch in the book Inventing the Middle Ages (1991) by the medievalist Norman Cantor. Cantor suggested that, but for his Jewish heritage, the young Kantorowicz could be considered a Nazi in terms of his intellectual temperament and cultural values. Cantor compared Kantorowicz with another contemporary German medievalist, Percy Ernst Schramm, who worked on similar topics and later joined the Nazi Party and served as the staff diarist for the German High Command during the war. In addition to highlighting Kantorowicz's elitist nationalism in the Weimar period, Cantor falsely claimed that Kantorowicz had been under the protection of the Nazi government.

Kantorowicz's defenders, including his student Robert L. Benson, responded that although as a younger man Kantorowicz embraced the Romantic ultranationalism of the George-Kreis, he had only contempt for Nazism and was a vocal critic of Hitler's regime, both before and after the war. Other historians who have criticized Kantorowicz in other respects have also since rejected Cantor's arguments, including David Abulafia and Robert E. Lerner. Conrad Leyser, summarizing the controversy in his 2016 introduction to The King's Two Bodies, describes Cantor's account as a "tissue of falsehoods and half-truths", but also a predictable reaction to Kantorowicz's own suppression of his German past. Michael Lipkin, also in 2016, concluded that Cantor was right to note the right-wing politics of Frederick the Second in particular, but he "cripples his argument by massaging his story".

Works
Kaiser Friedrich der Zweite, Georg Bondi, 1927. 
Das Geheime Deutschland, Vorlesung, 1933.

Works in English 
Frederick II.: 1194–1250 (1931) (online at Archive.org) 
"A Norman Finale of the Exultet and the Rite of Sarum", The Harvard Theological Review, 34 (2), (1941). . . .
"Plato in the Middle Ages", The Philosophical Review, 51 (3), (1942). . .
Laudes Regiae: A Study in Liturgical Acclamations and Mediaeval Ruler Worship, University of California Press, (1946). .
"The Quinity of Winchester", Art Bulletin, Vol. XXIV, (1947). . .
The Fundamental Issue: Documents and Marginal Notes on the University of California Loyalty Oath, Parker Print. Co., 1950. .
"Dante's 'Two Suns'", in Semitic and Oriental Studies, 1951.
"Pro Patria Mori in Medieval Political Thought", The American Historical Review, 56 (3), (1951). . .
"Inalienability: A Note on Canonical Practice and the English Coronation Oath in the Thirteenth Century", Speculum, Vol. XXIX, 1954. .
"Mysteries of State: An Absolutist Concept and its Late Medieval Origins", Harvard Theological Review, Vol. XLVIII, 1955. . .
The King's Two Bodies: A Study in Mediaeval Political Theology, Princeton University Press, (1957). . . .
Frederick the Second, 1194–1250, Frederick Ungar Publishing Co., 1957. .
"The Prologue to Fleta and the School of Petrus de Vinea," Speculum, 32 (2), 1957. . .
"On the Golden Marriage Belt and the Marriage Rings of the Dumbarton Oaks Collection", Dumbarton Oaks Papers, 14, 1960. . .
"The Archer in the Ruthwell Cross", The Art Bulletin, 42 (1), 1960. . .
Gods in Uniform, Proceedings of the American Philosophical Society, Vol. CV, 1961. .
"Puer Exoriens: On the Hypapante in the Mosaics of S. Maria Maggiore," Perennitas, 1963.
Selected Studies, J.J. Augustin, 1965. .

See also
Harold F. Cherniss, historian of ancient philosophy, friend and colleague of Kantorowicz, helped him secure a position at the Institute at Advanced Study after the 'loyalty oath' affair at Berkeley
Kahler-Kreis

References

Further reading
Abulafia, David. "Kantorowicz and Frederick II." History 62(205) (1977): 193–210. .
Boureau, Alain. Kantorowicz: Stories of a Historian The Johns Hopkins University Press, 2001. .
Cantor, Norman F. (1st) Inventing the Middle Ages, 1991. pp 79–117. negative view of Kantorowicz. .
Daum, Andreas, Hartmut Lehmann, James Sheehan (eds.), The Second Generation: Émigrés from Nazi Germany as Historians. With a Biobibliographic Guide. New York: Berghahn Books, 2016, .
Franke, Norman, "‘Divina Commedia teutsch’? Ernst H. Kantorowicz: Der Historiker als Politiker." In: Historische Zeitschrift (291, 2/2010), pp. 297–330 (German)
Franke, Norman, ’Honour and Shame’. Karl Wolfskehl and the v. Stauffenberg Brothers: Political Eschatology in Stefan George's Circle. In: Simms, Norman (ed.): Letters and Texts of Jewish History. Hamilton 1998, pp. 89–120
Free, John B. "Ernst Kantorowicz. An Accounting", Central European History, 32(2), (1999). .
Landauer, Carl. "Ernst Kantorowicz and the Sacralization of the Past", Central European History, Vol. 27(1), (1994). .
Lerner, Robert. Ernst Kantorowicz: A Life. Princeton University Press, 2016. .
Medieval Scholarship Biographical Studies on the Formation of a Discipline: History, Vol. I, ed. Helen Damico & Joseph B Zavadil, 1995; biographical essays for "Ernst H. Kantorowicz" by Robert E. Lerner and "Percy Ernst Schramm" by Janos Bak, both of whom respond to allegations in Cantor's book. .
Peters, Edward. "More Trouble With Henry: The Historiography of Medieval Germany in the Angloliterate World, 1888–1995." Central European History 28, no. 1 (1995): 47–72. . .
Rust, Jennifer R. "Political Theologies of the Corpus Mysticum: Schmitt, Kantorowicz, and de Lubac" (on The King's Two Bodies) in Political Theology and Early Modernity (University of Chicago Press, 2012): 102–123. . .

External links
Short biography and quotes from Ernst Kantorowicz
Guide to the Ernst Kantorowicz Collection at the Leo Baeck Institute, New York.

1895 births
1963 deaths
Writers from Poznań
People from the Province of Posen
20th-century American historians
20th-century American male writers
20th-century Freikorps personnel
German conservatives in the German Resistance
Jewish emigrants from Nazi Germany to the United States
German Jewish military personnel of World War I
Jewish historians
German medievalists
Institute for Advanced Study faculty
Humboldt University of Berlin alumni
Ludwig Maximilian University of Munich alumni
Heidelberg University alumni
Academic staff of Heidelberg University
Academic staff of Goethe University Frankfurt
University of California, Berkeley faculty
American medievalists
German art historians
German male non-fiction writers
Fellows of the Medieval Academy of America
Historians from California
American male non-fiction writers
Members of the American Philosophical Society